Kangwon National University (KNU) is one of ten Flagship Korean National Universities in Gangwon, South Korea. Established as Kangwon Provincial Chuncheon Agricultural College in 1947 in Chuncheon, it extended to a comprehensive university in 1978.

History
Initially established as an agricultural college, Kangwon National University has steadily expanded to the comprehensive university encompassing a full spectrum of academic fields. KNU expanded in 1997 adding a medical degree program and in 2000 a University Hospital. A law school, now called 'Graduate School of Judicial Affairs', has been operated to the University's graduate schools in 2002, is the only laboratory school in South Korea, as a model for the very-early stage of 'reform on Korean legal system'. In 2006, KNU merged with Samcheok University, adding the colleges of Veterinary medicine and Information Technology to KNU's existing colleges. Since March 2, 2009, KNU operates a state-of-the-art professional Law School as one of the officially approved school by Korean Government.

Organization and Administration

Office of International Affairs (OIA)
 Location : building #212 
 Hours of Operation : Monday-Friday, 9am-6pm (Lunch break 12pm-1pm)
 Organization of the OIA (Office of the International Affairs):

Contact Information
 Administration office of the Dormitory : +82-33-250-8073, +82-33-250-8052
 Kangwon National University Hospital : +82-33-258-2000

Undergraduate Program
KNU comprises 19 colleges with 93 departments and five graduate schools. → List of Degree Program (Click) 
 College of Business Administration
 College of Engineering
 College of Agriculture and Life Sciences
 College of Animal Life Sciences
 College of Art and Culture
 College of Education
 College of Social Sciences
 College of Forest and Environmental Sciences
 College of Nursing
 College of Veterinary Medicine
 College of Pharmacy
 College of Biomedical Sciences
 College of Humanities
 College of Natural Sciences
 College of Information Technology
 Division of Sports Science
 Interdisciplinary Program

Graduate schools
Graduate School (Click)
 College of Humanities and Social Sciences
 College of Natural Sciences
 College of Engineering
 College of Art and Sports
 College of Medicine
 Specialty Graduate School 
 Graduate School of Education 
 Graduate School of Business
 Graduate School of Industrial Technology 
 Graduate School of Information Science and Public Administration
 Graduate School of Judicial Affairs
 Graduate School of Green and Life Industry Policy
 Law School
 School of Medicine

Tuition Fees

Undergraduate Admission

Graduate Admission

Academic Information

Academic Calendar
http://www.kangwon.ac.kr/english/contents.do?key=1377&

Spring Semester: March 2 - Late June

Summer Break: Late June - Late August

Fall Semester: Early September - Late December

Winter Break: Late December - Late February

Enrollment
Current enrollment stands at more than 20,000 undergraduate and graduate students. Like plenty of South Korean Universities, KNU's academic schedule is also based on the semester system with the spring semester starting in first week of Mondays on March every year, and autumn semester usually starts in fourth week of Mondays in August.

University life

Festival
Every year in May, Kangwon National University Students' Union is the main event of the school festival, which is held in Dae Dongje, which consists of clubs, flip-flops and other performances such as club performances, performances and invitations to famous entertainers.

Chuncheon, Capital city of Gangwon province which proclaims as 'leisure city', affords its residents a wealth of recreational activities. Lakes in Chuncheon nearby (Soyang-ho, Chuncheon-ho and Uiam-ho) offers water skiing and boating facilities as well as several islands on these lakes. Hiking in the nearby mountains and snow skiing (in Gangchon) are less than an hour's reach from the university.

president

President
 1st Lee Min-jae
 2nd Lee Sang-joo
 3rd Lee Sang-joo
 4th Lee Chun-geun
 5th Moon Seon-jae
 6th Ha Seo-hyeon
 7th Park Yeong-su
 8th Choi Hyeon-seob
 9th Gwon Yeong-jung
 10th Shin Seung-ho
 11th Kim Heon-young

See also
 Flagship Korean National Universities
 List of national universities in South Korea
 List of universities and colleges in South Korea
 Education in Korea

References

External links
 Kangwon National University, Official Homepage
 Official Homepage 
 Official Homepage 
 Facebook: https://www.facebook.com/KNUKangwonNationalUniversity/
 Facebook for International Students: https://www.facebook.com/groups/170600732995607/?fref=ts

Universities and colleges in Gangwon Province, South Korea
Educational institutions established in 1947
National universities and colleges in South Korea
Chuncheon
1947 establishments in Korea